Daniel Enrique Retamal Vargas (born June 17, 1995) is a Chilean footballer who plays for club Deportes Puerto Montt as a goalkeeper.

Personal life
His older brother, Felipe, is also a footballer who was with Italian side Reggina at youth level and has played for both Deportes Melipilla and Deportes Colina. In addition, his father, Anselmo, is a goalkeeping coach.

Career statistics

Club

Notes

References

External links
 
 
 Daniel Retamal at as.com

Living people
1995 births
People from Santiago
People from Santiago Province, Chile
People from Santiago Metropolitan Region
Footballers from Santiago
Chilean footballers
Primera B de Chile players
Chilean Primera División players
Magallanes footballers
Deportes Magallanes footballers
Coquimbo Unido footballers
San Marcos de Arica footballers
Deportes Puerto Montt footballers
Association football goalkeepers